"You're in My Heart" is a song written and recorded by country music artist George Jones. It appeared as the B-side to his first single on Starday Records, "No Money in This Deal."

Recording and background
Jones recorded his first songs with Starday Records in the living room of Jack Starnes in Beaumont, Texas on January 19, 1954. The fourth recording was "You're in My Heart" a honky-tonk side obviously influenced by some late Hank Williams releases, including "My Heart Would Know." As Rich Kienzle notes in the 1994 Sony retrospective The Essential George Jones: The Spirit of Country, "When [producer] Pappy Daily met George at his second Starday session, he listened as the young man sang like every other singer before imparting the words of wisdom: 'George,' said Daily, 'You've sung like Roy Acuff, Lefty Frizzell, Hank Williams and Bill Monroe.  Can you sing like George Jones?'"

The song was the b-side to the very first recording ever cut by George Jones: "No Money in This Deal."

Personnel
 George Jones - vocal, acoustic
 Robert Larry "Blackie" Crawford - lead guitar
 John "Johnny" Rector - piano
 Corlue Bordelon - steel
 Buck Crawford - bass
 Olen "Big Red" Hays - fiddle
 Kenneth "Little Red" Hays - fiddle

1954 songs
Song recordings produced by Pappy Daily
George Jones songs
Songs written by George Jones